Francis Patrick "Frank" Wallace (20 December 1861 – 1 July 1925) was an Australian politician who was a member of the Legislative Assembly of Western Australia from 1897 to 1904.

Wallace was born at Campbells Camp, a locality near Dalby, Queensland. He came to Western Australia in 1886, initially living in the Kimberley. Wallace later went to the Eastern Goldfields, establishing a store in Yalgoo in 1896 (the year it was founded). When the Yalgoo Roads Board was gazetted later in 1896, he was elected as its first chairman.

Retiring as chairman of the roads board, Wallace was elected to parliament at the 1897 general election, winning the newly created seat of Yalgoo. In December 1899, he and another MP, John Conolly, volunteered to serve in the Boer War, enlisting in the West Australian Mounted Infantry. However, Wallace never made it to South Africa, withdrawing shortly before his contingent was about to leave. His business manager had been taken ill, necessitating a return to Yalgoo.

At the 1901 general election, Wallace's seat was abolished, and he successfully transferred to the new seat of Mount Magnet. He did not recontest Mount Magnet at the 1904 election, but later in that year unsuccessfully stood for the Legislative Council, losing to William Patrick in Central Province. In 1906, Wallace left Yalgoo and went to farm in Wagin (in the Great Southern). He later lived in Geraldton, and eventually retired to Perth, dying there in July 1925 (aged 63). He was unmarried.

References

1861 births
1925 deaths
Australian military personnel of the Second Boer War
Mayors of places in Western Australia
Members of the Western Australian Legislative Assembly
People from Queensland
Western Australian local councillors